The 1990 Hi-Tec British Open Squash Championships was held at the lambs Squash Club with the later stages being held at Wembley in London from 16–23 April 1990. The event was won for the seventh consecutive year by Susan Devoy who defeated Suzanne Horner (née Burgess) in the final.

Seeds

Draw and results

First round

Second round

Third round

Quarter-finals

Semi-finals

Final

References

Women's British Open Squash Championships
Women's British Open Squash Championship
Women's British Open Squash Championship
Squash competitions in London
Women's British Open Squash Championship
British Open Squash Championship
Women's British Open Squash Championship